Makowo may refer to the following places:

Bulgaria
 Makowo, Bulgaria, a village in northeastern Bulgaria

Poland
Makowo, Podlaskie Voivodeship (north-east Poland)
Makowo, Warmian-Masurian Voivodeship (north Poland)
Mąkowo, Pomeranian Voivodeship (north Poland)

Tanzania
 Makowo, Morogoro, a village in Morogoro Region, Tanzania
 Makowo, Njombe, a ward in Njombe Region, Tanzania

See also
 Makovo (disambiguation)